Dyckia is a genus of plants in the family Bromeliaceae, subfamily Pitcairnioideae.

The genus is named after the Prussian botanist, botanical artist and horticulturist The Prince and Earl of Salm Reifferscheid-Dyck (1773–1861).

Dyckias, with stiff and thorny leaves, prefer rocky and/or sunny areas and have a natural tendency to clump leading to thick, large mats.

The subfamily Pitcairnioideae contains several "terrestrial" members of the Bromeliaceae, with cultivated genera including Dyckia, Hechtia, Pitcairnia and Puya. Considered to be the most ancient lineage of bromeliads, they are endemic to arid and high-altitude regions of Brazil and the central part of South America.

Species
 Dyckia acutiflora Leme & Z.J.G.Miranda - Goiás
 Dyckia affinis Baker - Paraguay
 Dyckia agudensis Irgang & Sobral - Rio Grande do Sul
 Dyckia alba Winkler - Rio Grande do Sul
 Dyckia areniticola Leme - Mato Grosso
 Dyckia atratiflora P.J.Braun, Esteves & Scharf - Goiás
 Dyckia aurea L.B. Smith - Goiás
 Dyckia barthlottii R.Vásquez & Ibisch - Bolivia
 Dyckia beateae E. Gross & Rauh - Mato Grosso
 Dyckia beloisae L.B.Sm. - Minas Gerais
 Dyckia brachyphylla L.B. Smith - Minas Gerais
 Dyckia brachystachya Rauh & E. Gross - Bahia
 Dyckia bracteata (Wittmack) Mez - Minas Gerais, Espírito Santo
 Dyckia brasiliana L.B. Smith - Brasília 
 Dyckia braunii Rauh - Goiás
 Dyckia brevifolia Baker - from Paraná to Santa Catarina
 Dyckia burchellii Baker - Bahia, Goiás
 Dyckia burle-marxii L.B. Smith & R.W. Read - Bahia
 Dyckia cabrerae L.B. Smith & Reitz - from Paraná to Santa Catarina
 Dyckia cangaphila P.J.Braun, Esteves & Scharf - Goiás
 Dyckia choristaminea Mez - Rio Grande do Sul
 Dyckia cinerea Mez - Minas Gerais, Espírito Santo
 Dyckia commixta Hassler - Paraguay, Paraná
 Dyckia consimilis Mez - Minas Gerais
 Dyckia coximensis L.B. Smith & Reitz - Mato Grosso
 Dyckia crassifolia Rauh - Bolivia
 Dyckia crocea L.B. Smith - Paraná
 Dyckia dawsonii L.B. Smith - Goiás
 Dyckia delicata Larocca & Sobral - Rio Grande do Sul
 Dyckia deltoidea (L.B. Smith) L.B. Smith - Paraná
 Dyckia densiflora Schultes f. - Minas Gerais
 Dyckia dissitiflora Schultes f. - Piauí, Minas Gerais
 Dyckia distachya Hassler  - Paraguay, Brazil
 Dyckia domfelicianensis T. Strehl - Rio Grande do Sul
 Dyckia duckei L.B. Smith - Pará, Maranhão
 Dyckia dusenii L.B. Smith - Paraná, Santa Catarina
 Dyckia edwardii P.J.Braun, Esteves & Scharf -  Goiás
 Dyckia elata Mez - Minas Gerais
 Dyckia elisabethae Winkler - Rio Grande do Sul
 Dyckia elongata Mez - Bahia
 Dyckia eminens Mez - Goiás
 Dyckia encholirioides (Gaudichaud) Mez - São Paulo, Santa Catarina
 Dyckia espiritosantensis Leme & A.P.Fontana - Espírito Santo
 Dyckia estevesii Rauh - Mato Grosso
 Dyckia excelsa Leme - Mato Grosso
 Dyckia exserta L.B. Smith - Brazil, Paraguay 
 Dyckia ferox Mez - Mato Grosso, Argentina, Bolivia, Paraguay
 Dyckia ferruginea Mez - Mato Grosso
 Dyckia floribunda Grisebach - Argentina
 Dyckia formosensis Leme & Z.J.G.Miranda -  Goiás
 Dyckia fosteriana L.B. Smith - Paraná
 Dyckia frigida Hooker f. - Paraná
 Dyckia glabrifolia Leme & O.B.C.Ribeiro - Minas Gerais
 Dyckia glandulosa L.B. Smith & Reitz - Minas Gerais
 Dyckia goehringii E. Gross & Rauh - Minas Gerais
 Dyckia goiana L.B. Smith - Goiás
 Dyckia gouveiana Leme & O.B.C.Ribeiro - Minas Gerais
 Dyckia gracilis Mez - Argentina, Bolivia
 Dyckia grandidentata P.J.Braun & Esteves - Mato Grosso do Sul
 Dyckia granmogulensis Rauh - Minas Gerais
 Dyckia hatschbachii L.B. Smith - Paraná
 Dyckia hebdingii L.B. Smith - Rio Grande do Sul
 Dyckia hohenbergioides Leme & E. Esteves - Bahia
 Dyckia horridula Mez - Brazil
 Dyckia ibicuiensis T. Strehl - Rio Grande do Sul
 Dyckia ibiramensis Reitz - Santa Catarina
 Dyckia insignis Hassler - Paraguay
 Dyckia irmgardiae L.B. Smith - Rio Grande do Sul
 Dyckia irwinii L.B. Smith - Mato Grosso
 Dyckia joanae-marcioi P.J.Braun, Esteves & Scharf - Minas Gerais
 Dyckia jonesiana Strehl - Rio Grande do Sul
 Dyckia julianae T. Strehl - Rio Grande do Sul
 Dyckia kranziana Leme - Mato Grosso
 Dyckia lagoensis Mez - Minas Gerais
 Dyckia leptostachya Baker - Bolivia, Paraguay, Brazil, Argentina
 Dyckia limae L.B. Smith - Pernambuco
 Dyckia lindevaldae Rauh - Goiás
 Dyckia linearifolia Baker - Brazil
 Dyckia lunaris Leme - Goiás
 Dyckia lutziana L.B. Smith - São Paulo
 Dyckia macedoi L.B. Smith - Minas Gerais
 Dyckia machrisiana L.B. Smith - Goiás
 Dyckia macropoda L.B. Smith - Minas Gerais
 Dyckia maracasensis Ule - Bahia
 Dyckia maritima Baker - southern Brazil
 Dyckia marnier-lapostollei L.B. Smith - Minas Gerais, Goiás
 Dyckia martinellii B.R. Silva & Forzza - Rio de Janeiro
 Dyckia mauriziae Esteves & Hofacker - Goiás
 Dyckia mello-barretoi L.B. Smith - Minas Gerais
 Dyckia mezii Krapp
 Dyckia microcalyx Baker - Misiones, Mato Grosso do Sul, Paraná, Paraguay
 Dyckia milagrensis Leme - Bahia
 Dyckia minarum Mez - from Goiás to Santa Catarina
 Dyckia mirandana Leme & Z.J.G.Miranda - Goiás
 Dyckia mitis Castellanos - Misiones
 Dyckia montezumensis Leme - Minas Gerais
 Dyckia monticola L.B. Smith & Reitz - Minas Gerais, Santa Catarina
 Dyckia nana Leme & O.B.C.Ribeiro - Minas Gerais
 Dyckia nervata Rauh - Bahia
 Dyckia niederleinii Mez - Misiones
 Dyckia nigrospinulata Strehl - Rio Grande do Sul
 Dyckia odorata L.B. Smith - Goiás
 Dyckia orobanchoides Mez - Minas Gerais
 Dyckia paraensis L.B. Smith - Pará, Mato Grosso
 Dyckia pauciflora L.B. Smith & R.W. Read - Goiás
 Dyckia paucispina Leme & E. Esteves - Mato Grosso do Sul
 Dyckia pectinata L.B. Smith & Reitz - Minas Gerais
 Dyckia pernambucana L.B. Smith - Pernambuco
 Dyckia platyphylla L.B. Smith - Bahia
 Dyckia polycladus L.B. Smith - Rio Grande do Sul
 Dyckia pottiorum Leme - Mato Grosso do Sul
 Dyckia princeps Lemaire - Minas Gerais
 Dyckia pseudococcinea L.B. Smith - Rio de Janeiro
 Dyckia pulquinensis Wittmack - Bolivia (Santa Cruz)
 Dyckia pumila L.B. Smith - Goiás
 Dyckia racemosa Baker - Goiás
 Dyckia racinae L.B. Smith - Rio Grande do Sul
 Dyckia ragonesei Castellanos - Argentina
 Dyckia rariflora Schultes f. - Minas Gerais
 Dyckia reitzii L.B. Smith - southern Brazil
 Dyckia remotiflora Otto & Dietrich - Argentina, Uruguay, Brazil
 Dyckia retardata Winkler - Rio Grande do Sul
 Dyckia retroflexa Winkler - Rio Grande do Sul
 Dyckia richardii P.J.Braun & Esteves - Goiás
 Dyckia rigida T. Strehl - Rio Grande do Sul
 Dyckia rondonopolitana Leme - Mato Grosso
 Dyckia rupestris W. Till & Morawetz - Pernambuco
 Dyckia saxatilis Mez - central Brazil
 Dyckia schwackeana Mez - Minas Gerais
 Dyckia secunda L.B. Smith -Bahia
 Dyckia secundifolia Leme - Mato Grosso
 Dyckia selloa (K. Koch) Baker - southern Brazil
 Dyckia sellowiana Mez - Brasília 
 Dyckia sickii L.B. Smith - Pará
 Dyckia silvae L.B. Smith - Pará
 Dyckia simulans L.B. Smith - Minas Gerais
 Dyckia sordida Baker - Minas Gerais
 Dyckia spinulosa L.B. Smith & Reitz - Minas Gerais
 Dyckia stenophylla L.B. Smith - Goiás
 Dyckia stolonifera P.J.Braun & Esteves - Mato Grosso do Sul
 Dyckia subinermis Mez - Misiones
 Dyckia tenebrosa Leme & H. Luther - Minas Gerais
 Dyckia tenuis Mez - Goiás, Mato Grosso
 Dyckia tobatiensis Hassler - Paraguay
 Dyckia tomentella Mez - Paraguay
 Dyckia trichostachya Baker - Minas Gerais, Espírito Santo
 Dyckia tuberosa (Vellozo) Beer - from Bahia to Rio Grande do Sul
 Dyckia tweediei Mez - Salta, Santiago del Estero
 Dyckia uleana Mez - Goiás
 Dyckia ursina L.B. Smith - Minas Gerais
 Dyckia velascana Mez - Argentina
 Dyckia velloziifolia Mez - Paraguay
 Dyckia vestita Hassler - Paraguay
 Dyckia vicentensis Strehl - Rio Grande do Sul
 Dyckia virgata Mez - Paraguay
 Dyckia waechteri Strehl - Rio Grande do Sul
 Dyckia walteriana Leme - Paraná
 Dyckia warmingii Mez - Minas Gerais
 Dyckia weddelliana Baker - Minas Gerais

Gallery

References

External links
 BSI Genera Gallery photos

 
Bromeliaceae genera
Flora of South America
Flora of the Atlantic Forest